USS Warren may refer to the following ships of the United States Navy:

 , was a schooner commissioned in 1775; destroyed in 1776
 , was a frigate commissioned in 1776 and burned in 1779 to prevent capture
 , was a sloop-of-war commissioned in 1799 and sold in 1801
 , was a sloop-of-war commissioned in 1827 and sold in 1863
 , was a transport ship launched in 1943 and decommissioned in 1946

See also
 , was a U.S. Army transport (USAT) 1898–1922.
 

United States Navy ship names